Rockin' with Suzi Q was a weekly radio programme broadcast on BBC Radio 2, featuring Suzi Quatro playing her favourite blues, rock, and soul tunes from independent record labels.

As well as researching and presenting radio programmes, Quatro is the first female bass guitar player to become a major rock star. This broke a barrier to women's participation in rock music.

Format
Rockin' with Suzi Q was a weekly BBC Radio 2 music radio programme. It was researched and presented by Quatro.

Programmes started with Chuck Berry's "Sweet Little Rock 'n' Roller". In one programme, Quatro said "I've been doing this song for 30 years. It's what I was. It's what I am. It's what I always will be."

Next, Quatro would play her favourite blues, rock, and soul tunes from independent record labels, relating them back to her own life and experiences. She would also read out feedback received from listeners. An example was:
"Suzi is back with the music we love,
though many of the artists are in heaven above."

Reception

References

BBC Radio 2 programmes
Rock music radio programs
British music radio programmes